The 2003 Big South Conference baseball tournament  was the postseason baseball tournament for the Big South Conference, held from May 21 through 25 at Winthrop Ballpark, home field of Winthrop in Rock Hill, South Carolina.  The top six finishers participated in the double-elimination tournament. The champion, won the title for the sixth time, and third in a row, and earned an invitation to the 2003 NCAA Division I baseball tournament.

Format
The top six finishers from the regular season qualified for the tournament.  The teams were seeded one through six based on conference winning percentage and played a double-elimination tournament.  Birmingham–Southern was not eligible for championships as they completed their transition from NCAA Division II.

Bracket and results

All-Tournament Team

Most Valuable Player
Steven Carter was named Tournament Most Valuable Player.  Carter was a pitcher for Coastal Carolina, and won the award for the first of two consecutive years.  Through 2020, Carter is the only player to earn the award twice.

References

Tournament
Big South Conference Baseball Tournament
Big South baseball tournament
Big South Conference baseball tournament